Timbellus phyllopterus, common name : the leafy winged murex, is a species of sea snail, a marine gastropod mollusk in the family Muricidae, the murex snails or rock snails.

Description
The size of an adult shell varies between 50 mm and 100 mm.

Distribution
This marine species is distributed along the Lesser Antilles and the Mid-Atlantic Ridge. Sourced primarily by divers in Guadeloupe and Martinique, but presumably also to be found at Dominica which lies between those two French islands.

References

 Merle D., Garrigues B. & Pointier J.-P. (2011) Fossil and Recent Muricidae of the world. Part Muricinae. Hackenheim: Conchbooks. 648 pp. page(s): 133

External links
 

Muricidae
Gastropods described in 1822